HMCS Prestonian was a  that served with the Royal Canadian Navy during the Second World War and as a  from 1953–1956. She saw action primarily as a convoy escort. In 1956 she began service with the Royal Norwegian Navy as Troll.

Prestonian was ordered on 1 February 1943 as part of the 1943–1944 River-class building program. She was laid down as Beauharnois on 20 July 1943 by Davie Shipbuilding and Repairing Co. Ltd. at Lauzon, Quebec and launched 22 June 1944. Her name was changed to Prestonian and she was commissioned on 13 September 1944 at Quebec City.

Background

The River-class frigate was designed by William Reed of Smith's Dock Company of South Bank-on-Tees. Originally called a "twin-screw corvette", its purpose was to improve on the convoy escort classes in service with the Royal Navy at the time, including the Flower-class corvette. The first orders were placed by the Royal Navy in 1940 and the vessels were named for rivers in the United Kingdom, giving name to the class. In Canada they were named after towns and cities though they kept the same designation. The name "frigate" was suggested by Vice-Admiral Percy Nelles of the Royal Canadian Navy and was adopted later that year.

Improvements over the corvette design included improved accommodation which was markedly better. For underwater targets, the River-class frigate was equipped with a Hedgehog anti-submarine mortar and depth charge rails aft and four side-mounted throwers.

River-class frigates were the first Royal Canadian Navy warships to carry the 147B Sword horizontal fan echo sonar transmitter in addition to the irregular ASDIC. This allowed the ship to maintain contact with targets even while firing unless a target was struck. Improved radar and direction-finding equipment improved the RCN's ability to find and track enemy submarines over the previous classes.

Canada originally ordered the construction of 33 frigates in October 1941. The design was too big for the shipyards on the Great Lakes so all the frigates built in Canada were built in dockyards along the west coast or along the St. Lawrence River. In all Canada ordered the construction of 60 frigates including ten for the Royal Navy that transferred two to the United States Navy.

Service history
Due to her late entry into the Second World War, Prestonian did not see much action. Upon arriving at Halifax, she underwent major repairs and it was not until January 1945 that she began working up at Bermuda. After she returned she was assigned to EG 28, a local convoy escort group working out of Halifax. She remained with this unit until the end of the war in Europe. In preparation for service in the Pacific Ocean, Prestonian began a tropicalization refit at Halifax completing on 20 August 1945. However the plans to send her to the Pacific had been cancelled and she was paid off 9 November and sold to Marine Industries Ltd.

Prestonian was reacquired by the RCN to undergo conversion to a Prestonian-class ocean escort as part of the need to expand the anti-submarine force within the navy. This meant a flush-decked appearance aft, with a larger bridge and taller funnel. Her hull forward was strengthened against ice and the quarterdeck was enclosed to contain two Squid anti-submarine mortars. As the first ship to complete the conversion, she gave her name to the new class. In August 1953, Prestonian underwent builder's sea trials, testing the conversion before being recommissioned on 22 August 1953 with pennant 307. The frigate was made a part of the First Canadian Escort Squadron in November 1953. In April 1954, the First Canadian Escort Squadron deployed to Caribbean Sea for a training cruise, making several port visits. In September, the First Canadian Escort Squadron took part in the NATO naval exercise "New Broom II" and in October, the exercise "Morning Mist" before performing a two-month training cruise in the Mediterranean Sea, making several port visits. The squadron returned to Canada on 10 December 1954.

Royal Norwegian Navy
The frigate was paid off on 24 April 1956 and transferred to the Royal Norwegian Navy and renamed HNoMS Troll. She was employed primarily for fishery protection duties. In 1965 she was reclassified as a submarine depot ship and renamed HNoMS Horten. She served in this capacity until 1972 when the ship was discarded.

References

Notes

Sources
 
 Macpherson, Ken; Burgess, John (1981) The ships of Canada's naval forces 1910–1981 : a complete pictorial history of Canadian warships. Collins: Toronto. 
 HMCS Prestonian (K662) uboat.net

External links
 ReadyAyeReady.com – HMCS Prestonian

River-class frigates of the Royal Canadian Navy
1944 ships